Bergeria ornata is a moth of the family Erebidae. It was described by Sergius G. Kiriakoff in 1959. It is found in the Democratic Republic of the Congo.

References

Syntomini
Moths described in 1959
Erebid moths of Africa